Anders Fossøy Stadheim (born August 14, 1980) is a former Norwegian footballer, who played for Fredrikstad FK and Sogndal. His position was as a midfielder. He was capped twice for Norway, scoring one goal.

His father Ingvar is a former player and manager of the Norwegian national side.

External links
 
Player profile at altomfotball.no 
Player profile at ffksupporter.no 

Living people
1980 births
People from Sogn og Fjordane
People from Sogndal
Norwegian footballers
Norway international footballers
Sogndal Fotball players
Fredrikstad FK players
Norwegian First Division players
Eliteserien players
Association football midfielders
Sportspeople from Vestland